PGN may refer to:

Paignton railway station, National Rail station code PGN
Parameter Group Number, as defined in the Society of Automotive Engineers J1939 standard
Peptidoglycan, a polymer consisting of sugars and amino acids that forms a bacterial cell wall
Pertamina Gas Negara, a natural gas transportation and distribution company in Indonesia
Philadelphia Gay News, a newspaper in the Philadelphia area, Pennsylvania, United States
Portable Game Notation, a computer data format for recording chess games